Brett Elliott (born June 11, 1982) is an American football coach and former player. He is the co-offensive coordinator and quarterbacks coach at his alma mater, Linfield University. He was previously the quarterbacks coach at Texas State University.

Playing career

College
Elliott was the starter for the 2002 Utah Utes football team and began the season as the starter for the 2003 team before breaking his wrist in the second game of the season and being replaced by Heisman finalist and future #1 NFL draft pick Alex Smith.

After Alex Smith took over the starting job, Brett transferred to Linfield University where he led the 2004 Linfield Wildcats football team to an NCAA Division III Football Championship, and set national college football records including the season record for touchdowns thrown in a season (61). In 2005, he won both the Gagliardi Trophy and the Melberger Award.

College statistics

Professional
Elliot was on the San Diego Chargers roster in 2006. He served as a backup on the San Jose SaberCats in 2008, behind Mark Grieb. He did not throw a pass, but the SaberCats reached ArenaBowl XXII before losing to the Philadelphia Soul.

In 2010, Elliot became the starter for the Utah Blaze. He was 249-of-432 (57.6%) for 2,674 yards, 59 touchdowns and 17 interceptions. But the Blaze finished the 2010 season with a 2–14 record. In 2011, he joined the Georgia Force. Through three games, he led the AFL with a 126.06 quarterback rating.

Coaching career
In 2012, Elliott was hired as the graduate assistant for the offense at Mississippi State University. In 2015, Elliott is served as the co-offensive coordinator and quarterback's coach for James Madison University. In 2016, Elliott went to Texas State University where he served as Offensive Coordinator and QB Coach.  On February 7, 2017 news broke that he would be returning to Mississippi State as the quarterbacks coach replacing Brian Johnson who left MSU to become offensive coordinator at Houston. In March 2018, it was announced that Elliot would be rejoining the coaching staff of Texas State football as the quarterbacks coach. Since 2019, Elliott has been the co-offensive coordinator and quarterbacks coach for the Linfield Wildcats.

References

External links
 Linfield profile
 Texas State profile

1982 births
Living people
American football quarterbacks
Georgia Force players
James Madison Dukes football coaches
Linfield Wildcats football coaches
Linfield Wildcats football players
Mississippi State Bulldogs football coaches
Rhein Fire players
San Diego Chargers players
San Jose SaberCats players
Texas State Bobcats football coaches
Utah Blaze players
Utah Utes football players
Lake Oswego High School alumni
Sportspeople from Lake Oswego, Oregon
Sportspeople from Portland, Oregon
Players of American football from Portland, Oregon